The Bird With The Coppery, Keen Claws is a poem from Wallace Stevens's first book of poetry, Harmonium. It was originally published in 1921, so it is in the public domain. Librivox has made the poem available in voice recording in its The Complete Public Domain Poems of Wallace Stevens.

Interpretation
Leiter deems this poem one of Stevens's "most impenetrable" poems, containing "oxymoronic images" whose conflicting meanings must be held in abeyance. (This may not be far from the `Wilson effect' mentioned in the main Harmonium essay.) Bates compares the poem to Infanta Marina as a model of Stevens's use of a symbol to invest a landscape with his feeling for it. The aura of mystery that is characteristic of Stevens's naturalistic studies is evident here in the parakeet's brooding, his pure intellect applying its laws, and his exertion of his will.  Compare The Curtains in the House of the Metaphysician for another expression of Stevens's enigmatic naturalism.

By contrast, Paul Mariani in his biography of Stevens has referred to the poem as among the 'darkest' among the poet's criticisms of religion. For Mariani, "A parakeet of parakeets" is an allusion to the biblical reference to the divine as a "spirit of spirits", adopting the metaphor as a diminution of form and importance.

Notes

References 
Bates, Milton J. Wallace Stevens: A Mythology of Self. 1985: University of California Press.
Leiter, Louis H. "Sense in Nonsense: Wallace Stevens' "The Bird with the Coppery, Keen Claws". 1965: College English (Vol 26, No  7)

1921 poems
American poems
Poetry by Wallace Stevens